Roger Dill (born 5 July 1957) is an international cricket umpire.

He became the first umpire from the ICC Associates panel to officiate in a full ODI in May 2006, during the triangular series between Bermuda, Canada and Zimbabwe. To date, he has officiated in 25 ODIs.

He is also a sergeant in the Bermudian fire brigade.

See also
 List of One Day International cricket umpires

References

External links

1957 births
Living people
Bermudian One Day International cricket umpires